Dear Evan Hansen: Original Broadway Cast Recording is the cast album to the 2015 musical Dear Evan Hansen, with music and lyrics by Benj Pasek and Justin Paul, and a book by Steven Levenson. The recording stars Ben Platt, Rachel Bay Jones, Laura Dreyfuss, Jennifer Laura Thompson, Michael Park, Mike Faist, Will Roland and Kristolyn Lloyd. The album was produced by Alex Lacamoire, Pasek and Paul, and featuring musicians include Rob Jost, Adele Stein, Justin Smith, Ben Cohn, Jamie Eblen, Dillon Kondor, Justin Goldner, Christopher Jahnke and Todd Low. The album was released by Atlantic Records on January 27, 2017, and featured at #8 on the Billboard 200, making the highest debut for a cast album after Camelot (1961). It also topped the Internet Albums chart. It further received the Best Musical Theater Album award at the 60th Annual Grammy Awards.

Promotion and release 
The original Broadway cast album was announced on November 16, 2016, with pre-orders for the album beginning from December 9, 2016. The track "Waving Through a Window" was released as a special early download on the same date, for those who had pre-ordered the album. Additionally, the tracks "Requiem" and "You Will Be Found" were released as bonus pre-order singles on January 19 and 23, 2017. Atlantic Records released the soundtrack through digital formats on January 27, followed by a CD release on February 17. An exclusive vinyl album of the cast recording launched on July 21.

A deluxe album was announced on September 26, 2018, which contained all the songs from the Broadway cast recording, in addition to cut songs and covers. Three days prior, on September 23, Billboard exclusively released the track "Part of Me" as a single, performed by the cast from the U.S. Tour. The album was scheduled for release on October 19, but eventually released on November 2. The cut songs were performed by Taylor Trensch, Mallory Bechtel and Alex Boniello, who replaced the principal characters during the Broadway schedule. A cover version of "Waving Through a Window" was performed by Katy Perry to promote the show's national tour in North America, with her version being included in the deluxe edition.

Commercial response 
The album debuted at number eight on Billboard 200, registering the highest debut for a cast album after 1961's Camelot, which debuted at the fourth position. It also had surpassed 2015's Hamilton to top the Billboard 200 charts. In addition, the album was featured at number one in Top Broadway Albums and at number two in Top Pop Albums. After its win at the 71st Tony Awards, the album again peaked at number five in Billboard 200. In the first week, the album sold over 29,000 copies, with 25,000 coming from traditional sales. Over 123,000 copies were sold in the year of its release, and an additional 305,000 copies in 2018, to become one of the best-selling albums of the year. The album was certified Gold by RIAA on March 6, 2019. As of March 2021, the album sold over 640,000 copies.

Critical reception 

In her review for The Northern Light, Abby Seeber wrote, "The music is incredibly universal and will no doubt stand the test of time". Gramophone's Edward Seckerson wrote, "what really sets Pasek and Paul’s work apart is the emotional resonance of their melodies. The pop-rock nowness is painted in a contemporary funkiness, keyboards and guitars, acoustic and electric, dominating – but the soul of these songs is personal and timeless."

A critic for The Diamondback wrote that "Dear Evan Hansen vocalizes another timeless struggle: a dorky teenager both desperate and terrified of fitting in. This time social media plays a central role, one that heightens and elevates the stakes. The original cast album, sounds like inside of a teenager’s mind: frantic, immediate, life-or-death, now-or-never. Songs build and explode and then fall to a hush in the same way a teenagers panic, jump to conclusions and incorrectly assume their complete isolation."

Track listing 
All tracks are written by Benj Pasek and Justin Paul.

Personnel 

 Cast

 Ben Platt – Evan Hansen
 Rachel Bay Jones – Heidi Hansen
 Laura Dreyfuss – Zoe Murphy
 Jennifer Laura Thompson – Cynthia Murphy
 Michael Park – Larry Murphy
 Mike Faist – Connor Murphy
 Will Roland – Jared Kleinman
 Kristolyn Lloyd – Alana Beck

Additionally, Taylor Trensch, Mallory Bechtel and Alex Boniello (characters who replaces the original Broadway cast) playing Evan Hansen, Zoe Murphy and Connor Murphy, also recorded the musical numbers, which were included in the extended version. Few cast from the Original U.S. Tour ensemble also performed on a track.

 Ensemble vocals

 Jenn Colella
 Carrie Manolakos
 Ken Marks
 Asa Somers
 Jason Tam
 Brenda Wehle
 Natalie Weiss
 Tim Young
 Remy Zaken
 Tamika Lawrence
 Gerard Canonico
 Adam Halpin
 Becca Ayers
 Mary Bacon
 Mykal Kilgore
 Stephen Kunken

 Production

 Alex Lacamoire – orchestration, music supervision, executive production, arrangements
 Benj Pasek – composition, production
 Justin Paul – composition, production, vocal arrangements
 Stacey Mindich – production
 Jeffrey M. Wilson – executive production
 Wendy Orshan – executive production
 Rachel Weinstein – associate production
 Jayne Hong – associate production
 Pete Ganbarg – A&R production
 Emily Grishman – music copyist
 Ben Cohn – music direction, conduction
 Nevin Steinberg – Broadway sound effects
 Derik Lee – recording
 Nate Odden – assistant recording
 Ron Robinson – assistant recording
 Ebonie Smith – assistant recording
 Matthew Soares – assistant recording
 Scott Wasserman – programming
 Enrico De Trizio – programming
 Jeremy King – synthesizer programming
 Taylor Williams – synthesizer programming
 Randy Cohen – keyboard programming
 Christopher Jahnke – orchestration
 Jon Balcourt – associate conduction
 Michael Keller – music co-ordination
 Michael Aarons – music co-ordination
 Haley Bennett – music assistance
 Scott Skrzynski – mixing assistance
 Ari Conte – song assistance
 Neal Avron – mixing
 Tom Coyne – mastering

 Musicians

 Todd Low – viola
 Adele Stein – cello
 Ben Cohn – piano
 Jamie Eblen – drums
 Rob Jost – bass
 Dillon Kondor – guitar
 Justin Goldner – guitar
 Justin Smith – concertmaster

Charts

Weekly charts

Year-end charts

Certifications

Song certifications

References

External links 

 Official website

2017 soundtrack albums
Cast recordings
Theatre soundtracks
Atlantic Records soundtracks
Pop soundtracks
Soul soundtracks
Grammy Award for Best Musical Theater Album